Princess Beatrice (Beatrice Elizabeth Mary; born 8 August 1988) is a member of the British royal family. She is the elder daughter of Prince Andrew, Duke of York, and Sarah, Duchess of York. She is a niece of King Charles III and a granddaughter of Queen Elizabeth II. Born fifth in line of succession to the British throne, she is now ninth. She has a younger sister, Princess Eugenie.

Born in Portland Hospital, London, Beatrice attended St George's School, Ascot, before studying at Goldsmiths College, graduating with a bachelor's degree in history. She was briefly employed at the Foreign Office and Sony Pictures before joining software company Afiniti as Vice President of Strategic Partnerships. Beatrice also works privately with a number of charitable organisations, including the Teenage Cancer Trust and Outward Bound.

She married Edoardo Mapelli Mozzi, a property developer and English born Italian noble, in 2020. Their daughter Sienna Elizabeth was born in September 2021.

Upon the death of Elizabeth II and the accession of King Charles III, Princess Beatrice became a Counsellor of State, a senior position within the royal family limited to the first four in the line of succession over the age of 21 and the sovereign's consort.

Early life and education

Princess Beatrice was born at 8:18 pm on 8 August 1988 at the Portland Hospital, the first child of the Duke and Duchess of York, and fifth grandchild of Queen Elizabeth II and Prince Philip, Duke of Edinburgh. She was baptised in the Chapel Royal at St James's Palace on 20 December 1988, her godparents being Viscount Linley (her father's cousin, now the 2nd Earl of Snowdon); the Duchess of Roxburghe (now Lady Jane Dawnay); Peter Palumbo; Gabrielle Greenall; and Carolyn Cotterell. Her name, an unexpected choice, was not announced until almost two weeks after her birth.

Beatrice's parents divorced amicably when she was seven years old. The Duke and Duchess of York had agreed to joint custody of their two children. After the divorce, the Queen provided her parents with £1.4 million to set up a trust fund for her and Eugenie. Beatrice and her sister frequently travelled abroad with one or both of their parents.

Beatrice began her early education at the independent Upton House School in Windsor, in 1991. From there, she and her sister both attended the independent Coworth Park School (now Coworth Flexlands School) from 1995. Beatrice continued her education at the independent St George's School in Ascot, where she was a pupil from 2000 to 2007. She was diagnosed with dyslexia at the age of seven and went public with the diagnosis in 2005. She delayed sitting her GCSE exams for one year. She remained at St George's to take her A-Levels, earning an 'A' in drama, a 'B' in history, and a 'B' in film studies. She was elected Head Girl in her final year, and was a member of the school choir. Beatrice celebrated her 18th birthday with a masked ball at Windsor Castle in July 2006. Nikolai von Bismarck took her official birthday portrait.

In September 2008, Beatrice started a three-year course studying for a BA in history and history of ideas at Goldsmiths, University of London. She graduated in 2011 with a 2:1 degree.

Career 
During the summer of 2008, Beatrice obtained work experience as a sales assistant at Selfridges. She also worked at the Foreign Office's press office for a period of time without receiving a salary. It was also reported in 2008 that Beatrice was interested in pursuing a career at the Financial Times website. Beatrice was the first member of the family to appear in a non-documentary film when she had a small, non-speaking role as an extra in The Young Victoria (2009), based on the accession and early reign of her ancestor Queen Victoria. For a while, she was a paid intern at Sony Pictures, but she resigned after the hacking incident that affected the company in late 2014.

In April 2015, it was reported that Beatrice had decided to move to New York City. , Beatrice had a full-time job and split her time between London and New York City. She is known as Beatrice York in her professional life and is Vice President of Partnerships and Strategy at Afiniti. She is also in charge of an Afiniti programme to engage senior business chiefs around the world to support women in leadership. She works with the programme through charity endeavours and speaking engagements.

In January 2022, it was reported that Beatrice had lost her taxpayer-funded police security in 2011, supposedly after her uncle Charles III (then Prince of Wales) intervened.

Personal life

Early relationships
In 2006, Beatrice was briefly in a relationship with Paolo Liuzzo, an American whose previous charge for assault and battery caused controversy at the time. For ten years, until July 2016, she was in a relationship with Virgin Galactic businessman Dave Clark.

Marriage and family

In March 2019, Beatrice attended a fundraising event at the National Portrait Gallery, London, accompanied by property developer Edoardo Mapelli Mozzi, the son of Alex Mapelli-Mozzi, a former British Olympian and descendant of the Italian nobility; the BBC describes Edoardo as "also a count", like his father; however, that title is not officially recognised in Italy or the UK. The couple are believed to have begun dating in September 2018. Together, they attended the wedding of Lady Gabriella Windsor, Beatrice's second cousin once removed.

Princess Beatrice and Mozzi became engaged in Italy in September 2019, with their engagement formally announced by the Duke of York's Office on 26 September.

The wedding was scheduled to take place on 29 May 2020 at the Chapel Royal at St James's Palace, followed by a private reception in the gardens of Buckingham Palace, but first the reception and then the wedding itself were postponed because of the COVID-19 pandemic. The wedding was eventually held in private on 17 July 2020, at the Royal Chapel of All Saints, Royal Lodge, Windsor, and was not publicly announced in advance. Beatrice's father walked her down the aisle. Her wedding dress was a remodelled Norman Hartnell dress that was lent by the Queen, and she wore the Queen Mary Fringe Tiara that was also worn by the Queen at her own wedding.

Princess Beatrice has a stepson, Christopher Woolf (born 2016), her husband's child from a relationship with architect Dara Huang. She gave birth to a daughter, Sienna Elizabeth Mapelli Mozzi, on 18 September 2021 at the Chelsea and Westminster Hospital in Chelsea, London. With the death of Queen Elizabeth II on 8 September 2022, the child became tenth in line to the throne.

Sienna was christened at the Chapel Royal at St James's Palace, on 29 April 2022. Beatrice and her husband lived at a four-bedroom apartment at St James's Palace, but reportedly moved to a manor home in the Cotswolds in late 2022.

Activities 
In 2002, Beatrice visited children living with HIV in Russia. In Britain, she supported Springboard for Children (a literacy project for primary-school children with learning difficulties) and the Teenage Cancer Trust. In an interview to mark her 18th birthday, Beatrice said she wanted to use her position to assist others through charity work; she had already undertaken charitable duties alongside her mother through the various organisations the Duchess supported.

In April 2010, running to raise money for Children in Crisis, she became the first member of the royal family to complete the London Marathon. Beatrice is the patron of Forget Me Not Children's Hospice, which supports children with life-shortening conditions in West Yorkshire and North Manchester. At the April 2011 wedding of her cousin Prince William, Beatrice's unusual fascinator, designed by Philip Treacy, received much attention and derision from the public and the media. The following month, the headpiece was auctioned for £81,000 on eBay, with the proceeds going to two charities: UNICEF and Children in Crisis.

Beatrice and the Duke of Edinburgh accompanied the Queen to the traditional Royal Maundy services on 5 April 2012 in York. There, Beatrice interacted with parishioners, received flowers from the public, and assisted the Queen as she passed out the official Maundy money to the pensioners. In the lead up to the 2012 Summer Olympics, Beatrice welcomed the Olympic flame on the steps of Harewood House near Leeds. In 2013, Beatrice and her sister promoted Britain overseas in Germany. She also visited the Isle of Wight in 2014, whose governor was Beatrice's namesake Princess Beatrice, daughter of Queen Victoria.

In November 2012, Beatrice became a patron of the York Musical Society. In April 2013, she became royal patron of the Helen Arkell Dyslexia Centre, a charity that she credits with helping her overcome her own academic challenges resulting from dyslexia. She accompanied her father during an official engagement in the United Arab Emirates on 24 November 2014.

In 2016, Beatrice, her mother, and her sister Eugenie collaborated with British contemporary artist Teddy McDonald to create the first royal contemporary art painting. Titled Royal Love, it was painted at Royal Lodge and exhibited at Masterpiece London before being sold with all proceeds from the sale donated by McDonald to Children in Crisis. In 2018, Children in Crisis merged with Street Child, a children's charity active in multiple countries, with Beatrice serving as its ambassador. She is also a supporter of the Pitch@Palace initiative, a charity her father founded to amplify and accelerate entrepreneurs' business ideas.

Beatrice took part in a South Asia Tour 2016 that lasted nine days. She visited Nepal, India, and Bhutan on behalf of the Franks Family Foundation (FFF), and Jamgon Kongtrul Eyes Centres, a free micro-surgical cataract programme in technical collaboration with Nepal's Tilganga Eye Centre under Nepali eye surgeon Sanduk Ruit's direction. A few weeks later, she attended the 2016 Asia Game Changer Awards Dinner at the United Nations in New York City, which honoured Ruit and others. Beatrice and Charles Rockefeller presented Ruit with his Asia Society Asia Game Changer award.

Beatrice is the founder of Big Change, a charity she established with six of her friends to encourage young people to develop skills "outside a traditional academic curriculum". In 2012, she climbed Mont Blanc in aid of the charity. In 2016, with Richard Branson and his children, she participated in the fundraising challenge Virgin Strive Challenge, which involved climbing Mount Etna.

In 2017, Beatrice helped promote the anti-bullying book Be Cool Be Nice and gave an interview to Vogue at a House of Lords event, speaking about her own experiences with being bullied for her fashion choices in her early adulthood.  Hello! magazine later named her one of the best-dressed royals. In May 2018, she attended the Met Gala in New York City. In October 2018, she undertook an extended tour of Laos to "raise the profile of the UK" there, and also participated in the Luang Prabang Half Marathon for Children.

In March 2019, Beatrice was elected to the board of the UK charity the Outward Bound Trust as a trustee, after her father took over the patronage from his father, the Duke of Edinburgh. In May 2019, she was honoured at a gala in New York City for her work with Friends Without a Border. She has supported the Kairos Society, a nonprofit organisation of entrepreneurs at universities in China, Europe, India and the US.

In April 2022 and in her capacity as an ambassador for the charity Made By Dyslexia, Beatrice and her husband took part in the first World Dyslexia Assembly, which was hosted by Prince Carl Philip in Sweden.

On 17 September 2022, during the period of official mourning for Queen Elizabeth II, Beatrice joined her sister and six cousins to mount a 15-minute vigil around the coffin of the late Queen, as it lay in state at Westminster Hall. On 19 September, she joined other family members at the state funeral.

In February 2023, Beatrice was named patron of the British Skin Foundation.

Titles, styles, and arms

Titles and styles

As a male-line grandchild of the sovereign, Beatrice was known as "Her Royal Highness Princess Beatrice of York", at birth, with the territorial designation coming from her father's title, Duke of York. Since her marriage, she has been styled "Her Royal Highness Princess Beatrice, Mrs Edoardo Mapelli Mozzi" in the Court Circular.

Arms

Authored articles

References

External links 

 
 

1988 births
Living people
Alumni of Goldsmiths, University of London
Alumni of the University of London
British princesses
Businesspeople from London
Businesspeople from New York City
Daughters of British dukes
English Anglicans
English people of Danish descent
English people of German descent
English people of Greek descent
English people of Russian descent
English people of Scottish descent
House of Windsor
Mapelli-Mozzi family
Mountbatten-Windsor family
People educated at St. George's School, Ascot
People from Old Windsor
People from Sunninghill
People from Westminster
Royalty and nobility with dyslexia
Prince Andrew, Duke of York